Kalleh Khaneh (also Romanized as Kalleh Khāneh, Kolah Khāneh, and Koleh Khāneh; also known as Galeh Khāneh, Kholakhāneh, Kulagkhaneg, and Kulahkhaneh) is a village in Howmeh Rural District, in the Central District of Abhar County, Zanjan Province, Iran. At the 2006 census, its population was 29, in 13 families.

References 

Populated places in Abhar County